The 1989 Western Michigan Broncos football team represented Western Michigan University in the Mid-American Conference (MAC) during the 1989 NCAA Division I-A football season.  In their third season under head coach Al Molde, the Broncos compiled a 5–6 record (3–5 against MAC opponents), finished in sixth place in the MAC, scored 210 points and allowed opponents to likewise score 210 points.  The team played its home games at Waldo Stadium in Kalamazoo, Michigan.

The team's statistical leaders included Brad Tayles with 1,909 passing yards, Dan Boggan with 744 rushing yards, and Allan Boyko with 563 receiving yards. Tayles was named the MAC freshman of the year.

Schedule

References

Western Michigan
Western Michigan Broncos football seasons
Western Michigan Broncos football